The Saulė Cemetery is a cemetery in Antakalnis district of Vilnius, Lithuania. It is the old parish cemetery of the St. Peter and St. Paul Church and is the place of rest of many noble Poles and Lithuanians.

History
It is believed that the first burials took place during the 1710 plague. The Chapel of St. Vincent de Paul was built in 1811, but the first known mention of the cemetery is only from 1828. It was the parish cemetery of the nearby St. Peter and St. Paul Church until 1945. At that time, Soviet authorities renamed the cemetery after the nearby Saulė Street.

The cemetery has three family chapels-mausoleums of Zawiszas, Ogiński, and Meysztowicz families.

Notable burials
Famous people buried here include:
 Danielius Alseika (1881–1936), Lithuanian physician and activist
 Jonas Kazlauskas (1930–1970), Lithuanian linguist
 Petras Kraujalis (1882–1933), Lithuanian activist
 Meilė Lukšienė (1913–2009), Lithuanian historian
 Teodoras Valaitis (1934–1974), sculptor-modernist
 Józef Zawadzki (1781–1838), the editor of the first poems of Adam Mickiewicz
 Wincenta Zawadzka (1824–1894), author of Kucharka Litewska (Lithuanian Cook), the first Lithuanian cookbook

References

External links
 

Cemeteries in Vilnius
Cemeteries established in the 1820s
1828 establishments in the Russian Empire